Exostoma stuarti is a species of sisorid catfish  from Myanmar.

Etymology
The fish is named after geologist Murray Stuart of the Geological Survey of India, who collected the type specimen.

References

Talwar, P.K. and A.G. Jhingran, 1991. Inland fishes of India and adjacent countries. Volume 2. A.A. Balkema, Rotterdam.

Catfish of Asia
Fish of India
Taxa named by Sunder Lal Hora
Fish described in 1923
Sisoridae